Bilhorod-Dnistrovskyi Raion is a raion (district) in Odesa Oblast of Ukraine. It is part of the historical region of Bessarabia. Its administrative center is the town of Bilhorod-Dnistrovskyi. Population: 

On 18 July 2020, as part of the administrative reform of Ukraine, the number of raions of Odesa Oblast was reduced to seven, and the area of Bilhorod-Dnistrovskyi Raion was significantly expanded.  The January 2020 estimate of the raion population was

Administrative division

Current
After the reform in July 2020, the raion consisted of 16 hromadas:
 Bilhorod-Dnistrovskyi urban hromada  with the administration in the city of Bilhorod-Dnistrovskyi, transferred from Bilhorod-Dnistrovskyi Municipality;
 Dyviziya Hromada
 Karolino-Buhaz rural hromada
 Kulevcha Hromada
 Lyman Hromada
 Marazliivka rural hromada with the administration in the selo of Marazliivka, retained from Bilhorod-Dnistrovskyi Raion;
 Moloha rural hromada with the administration in the selo of Moloha, retained from Bilhorod-Dnistrovskyi Raion;
 Petropavlivka Hromada
 Plakhtiivka Hromada
 Sarata Hromada
 Serhiivka settlement hromada with the administration in the urban-type settlement of Serhiivka, retained from Bilhorod-Dnistrovskyi Raion and Bilhorod-Dnistrovskyi Municipality;
 Shabo rural hromada with the administration in the selo of Shabo, retained from Bilhorod-Dnistrovskyi Raion;
 Starokozache rural hromada with the administration in the selo of Starokozache, retained from Bilhorod-Dnistrovskyi Raion;
 Tatarbunary Hromada
 Tuzly Hromada
 Uspenivka Hromada

Before 2020

Before the 2020 reform, the raion consisted of five hromadas, 
 Marazliivka rural hromada with the administration in Marazliivka;
 Moloha rural hromada with the administration in Moloha;
 Serhiivka settlement hromada with the administration in Serhiivka (partially in Bilhorod-Dnistrovskyi Municipality);
 Shabo rural hromada with the administration in Shabo;
 Starokozache rural hromada with the administration in Starokozache.

References

 
Raions of Odesa Oblast
1957 establishments in Ukraine